Megachile paratasmanica is a species of bee in the family Megachilidae. It was described by Rayment in 1955.

References

Paratasmanica
Insects described in 1955